Dairsie Bridge is a 16th-century stone bridge, located  south of Dairsie, in north-east Fife, Scotland. It carries a minor road across the River Eden, linking the parishes of Dairsie to the north and Kemback to the south. The bridge is protected as a Category A listed building.

History
There was an earlier bridge at Dairsie, as it is recorded that King James IV crossed it on his way from St Andrews to Stirling in 1496.

The present bridge bears an inscribed stone displaying the arms and initials of James Beaton (1473–1539), Archbishop of St Andrews, and it is likely that he ordered the bridge to be built during his episcopate (1522–1539). Nearby Dairsie Castle had been a property of the archbishops of St Andrews until the early 16th century.

The Eden flows under the two southern arches, and cutwaters project from the bridge's piers. Only minor alterations, to the parapets and approaches, have been carried out since the bridge's construction.

References

External links

Bridges in Fife
Category A listed buildings in Fife
Listed bridges in Scotland
Road bridges in Scotland
Stone arch bridges
16th-century establishments in Scotland
Bridges completed in the 16th century